Allsebrook  is an English surname. Notable people with the surname include:

 Richard Allsebrook (1892–1961), English footballer
 John Allsebrook Simon (1873–1954), British politician

English-language surnames